No. 16 Squadron was a fighter squadron of the Royal New Zealand Air Force. Formed in July 1942 at RNZAF Base Woodbourne, the squadron was equipped with Curtiss P-40 Kittyhawks and later F4U Corsairs. The squadron fought in the Southwest Pacific theatre during the Second World War, flying combat operations against Japanese forces. Proposed re-equipment with the P-51 Mustang was abandoned at the cessation of hostilities, and the squadron returned to New Zealand where it was disbanded in October 1945.

History
It was formed on 1 July 1942 at RNZAF Base Woodbourne, near Blenheim, under the command of Squadron Leader A. Jones. The squadron served in Espiritu Santo, Guadalcanal, New Georgia, Bougainville, Green Island and Jacquinot Bay.

On 15 January 1945 during an attack on Toboi, southwest of Rabaul, by Corsairs from 14 and 16 Squadrons, a 14 Squadron Corsair was shot down and the pilot parachuted into Simpson Harbour. 14 and 16 Squadron Corsairs provided fighter cover for a possible rescue operation until the evening when, low on fuel they returned to Green Island. Encountering a tropical storm during their return flight, 5 Corsairs crashed into the sea, one crashed at Green Island while landing and a seventh disappeared in clouds with all 7 pilots killed. The shot down pilot was captured by the Japanese and died in captivity.

Commanding officers
The following served as commanding officers of No. 16 Squadron:
Squadron Leader A. N. Jones (June 1942–May 1943);
Squadron Leader J. S. Nelson (May–September 1943);
Squadron Leader J. H. Arkwright (October 1943–January 1944);
Squadron Leader A. G. Sievers (January–June 1944);
Squadron Leader M. C. P. Jones (June–September 1944);
Squadron Leader P. S. Green (October 1944–June 1945);
Squadron Leader J. H. Mills (July–October 1945).

Gallery

Notes

References
 

16
Military units and formations established in 1942
Squadrons of the RNZAF in World War II
Military units and formations disestablished in 1945